Ling Long is a Chinese mathematician whose research concerns modular forms, elliptic surfaces, and dessins d'enfants, as well as number theory in general. She is a professor of mathematics at Louisiana State University.

Early life and education
Long studied mathematics, computer science, and engineering at Tsinghua University, graduating in 1997. She went to Pennsylvania State University for her graduate studies; her dissertation, Modularity of Elliptic Surfaces, she worked on with Noriko Yui, visiting from Queen's University, in her time as a graduate student. She was supervised and influenced by Winnie Li.

Career
After postdoctoral research at the Institute for Advanced Study, Long joined the faculty at Iowa State University in 2003. After a year at Cornell University in 2012–2013, she moved to Louisiana State.

Recognition
Long was the 2012–2013 winner of the Ruth I. Michler Memorial Prize of the Association for Women in Mathematics.
She was named to the 2023 class of Fellows of the American Mathematical Society, "for contributions to hypergeometric arithmetic, noncongruence Modular Forms, and supercongruences".

She is included in a deck of playing cards featuring notable women mathematicians published by the Association for Women in Mathematics.

References

External links

Year of birth missing (living people)
Living people
Chinese mathematicians
20th-century American mathematicians
21st-century American mathematicians
American women mathematicians
Tsinghua University alumni
Pennsylvania State University alumni
Iowa State University faculty
Louisiana State University faculty
20th-century women mathematicians
21st-century women mathematicians
20th-century American women
21st-century American women
Fellows of the American Mathematical Society